Sarah Elizabeth "Tizzy" Lockman is an American politician and member of the Democratic Party. She serves in the Delaware Senate representing District 3, which covers parts of Wilmington, including the downtown and Riverfront areas.

Early life and career

Lockman was raised on the west side of Wilmington, Delaware and graduated from Alexis I. duPont High School. She received a B.A. from New York University and a M.A. from the University of Delaware. She works as an adjunct professor at the University of Delaware.

Political career

In 2014, Lockman was appointed a member of the Wilmington Education Advisory Committee (WEAC) by Governor Jack Markell, and she became vice chair when the body turned into the Wilmington Education Improvement Commission (WEIC).

Lockman defeated Jordan Hines, both political novices, in the Democratic primary, in a contentious and closely watched race. With no general election opponent, the win ensured she would succeed Robert Marshall, who had represented the area for over 40 years. Lockman is the second African-American woman to be elected to the Delaware Senate, after Margaret Rose Henry, who retired the year before Lockman was elected. In 2020, Lockman was elected as Senate Majority Whip.

Personal life

In December 2020, Lockman married John Collins.

References

External links
Official page at the Delaware General Assembly
Campaign site
 

Living people
Year of birth missing (living people)
Democratic Party Delaware state senators
Women state legislators in Delaware
African-American state legislators in Delaware
21st-century American women politicians
21st-century American politicians
21st-century African-American women
21st-century African-American politicians